The 2005 EAFF East Asian Football Championship was a football competition between teams from East Asian countries and territories held from 31 July to 7 August 2005 in South Korea, with the qualifiers held in Taiwan in March 2005.

China PR, South Korea, and Japan were the automatic finalists. The fourth finalist spot was competed among North Korea, Guam, Hong Kong, Chinese Taipei, and Mongolia. North Korea was the winner in the qualifiers.

Participating teams

Preliminary

Finals
 – 2003 East Asian Football Championship third place
 – Winners of the preliminary competition
 – 2006 FIFA World Cup participant
 – 2006 FIFA World Cup participant

Venues

Preliminary competition

Final Tournament

Preliminary competition

Matches
Macau was suspended by FIFA from entering the competition during the match period. Each countries played against the other 4 countries on a round robin basis.

All times are local time, National Standard Time (UTC+08:00)

Personal Awards

Final tournament

Squads

Matches
The final tournament started on 31 July 2005. China won their first ever international title. The next tournament was scheduled for 2008.

Personal awards

Final standings

References
East Asian Cup 2005 at RSSSF

External links

East Asian Football Championship, 2005
2005
2005
2005
2005 in South Korean football